Por esa Puerta is the last studio album by Mexican singer Verónica Castro. It was released in 2005. "Por esa Puerta" was used for the reality series, Big Brother VIP, seen only in Mexico and hosted by Castro.

Note: the CD was originally titled "Este pedacito es tuyo" there was a cover, but at the end the titled was changed to "Por esa Puerta" after the title song became a hit on the show Big Brother VIP.

Track listing
 "Por esa Puerta"  (Verónica Castro; Héctor Villa; San Angel)
 "A la basura"  (Luis Elizalde)
 "Este pedacito es tuyo"  (José Eduardo Piña)
 "Aquel hombre"  (Federico Ayala)
 "Muérdete la lengua"  (Miguel Escalante)
 "Soy rebelde"  (D.R.A)
 "Agárramelo" (Saúl Guerrero)
 "Pórtate mal" (D.R.A)
 "Acarìciame" (Coco R. Jimenez)
 "Producto Desechado" (Luis Elizalde)
 "Sueños"  (José Luis ayala)

Singles

2005 albums
Verónica Castro albums